The Wandering Jew is a 1923 British silent fantasy film directed by Maurice Elvey and starring Matheson Lang, Hutin Britton and Malvina Longfellow. It was based on a play by E. Temple Thurston. It was remade in 1933 as The Wandering Jew.

Premise
A Jewish man is condemned to wander aimlessly through the ages.

Cast
 Matheson Lang - Mattathias 
 Hutin Britton - Judith 
 Malvina Longfellow - Granella 
 Isobel Elsom - Olalla Quintane 
 Florence Saunders - Joanne 
 Shayle Gardner - Pietro Morelli 
 Hubert Carter - The Ruler 
 Jerrold Robertshaw - Juan de Texada 
 Winifred Izard - Rachel 
 Fred Raynham - Inquisitor 
 Lewis Gilbert - Mario 
 Hector Abbas - Zapportas 
 Lionel d'Aragon - Raymond 
 Gordon Hopkirk - Lover

References

External links

1923 films
British historical fantasy films
British silent feature films
1920s English-language films
Films directed by Maurice Elvey
1920s historical fantasy films
British films based on plays
Wandering Jew
British black-and-white films
1920s British films